Victor Nogueira (born July 17, 1959 in Mozambique) is a retired American soccer goalkeeper. Nogueira spent six seasons in the North American Soccer League, but gained his greatest recognition in over twenty seasons in three indoor leagues, the Major Indoor Soccer League, National Professional Soccer League and the second Major Indoor Soccer League. He was also a member of the U.S. futsal team which took second place at the 1992 FIFA Futsal World Championship, and he is the father of FC Kansas City and United States forward Casey Loyd. He was elected to the Indoor Soccer Hall of Fame in 2011.

Outdoor soccer

Early career
Nogueira was born in Maputo, Mozambique, but was raised in South Africa. In 1974, when he was fifteen, Nogueira signed with Rangers, a South African club based in Johannesburg. While he gained his fame as a goalkeeper, he began his career as a forward. In his first season with Rangers as a keeper, he was switched to forward for the last 10 games and scored 10 goals. He was traded Newcastle United to England and played on the reserves for 6 months prior to Joining the Atlanta Chiefs.

NASL
In 1979, Nogueira moved to the Atlanta Chiefs of the North American Soccer League (NASL). He spent at least two seasons in Atlanta before moving to the Montreal Manic. No statistics exist for the 1981 season. Nogueira suffered significant injuries at times during his career, so he may have lost that season due to injuries. Nogueira played nineteen games with the Montreal Manic in 1982, then moved to the Chicago Sting for the 1983 and 1984 NASL seasons. Nogueira and the Sting won the 1984 NASL title, the last year the league existed.

Indoor soccer

NASL
In 1979–80, the NASL held an indoor season. The Chiefs won the Eastern Division before falling to the Tampa Bay Rowdies in the playoffs. Nogueira was the second leading goalkeeper.

MISL
The NASL had planned a 1984–1985 indoor season, but cancelled it. When the league subsequently cancelled its 1985 outdoor season and folded, the Chicago Sting jumped to the Major Indoor Soccer League (MISL). In 1986, the Sting traded Nogueira to the Cleveland Force for Cris Vaccaro. The Force folded at the end of the 1987–1988 season and Nogueira moved to the San Diego Sockers.

When he arrived in San Diego, Nogueira joined a championship team who had Zoltán Tóth, the top goalkeeper in the league. Nogueira quickly supplanted Toth as the team's starting goalkeeper as the Sockers won 1988–1989 MISL title. Nogueira was also named the MISL Goalkeeper of the Year. The Sockers repeated as champions every season through 1991–1992 as Nogueira was a three-time Goalkeeper of the Year. The league folded at the end of the season and the Sockers moved to the Continental Indoor Soccer League. Nogueira did not make that move, but jumped to the Milwaukee Wave of the National Professional Soccer League (NPSL). Although thirty-two at the time, Nogueira would spend the next eleven years with the Wave.

NPSL
During his eleven seasons in Milwaukee, Nogeuira won another three titles as the Wave won 1997–1998, 1999–2000 and 2000–2001 championships. In addition to winning the title in 1998, Nogueira was named the league MVP, playoff MVP, All-Star MVP, and Goalkeeper of the Year and first team All Star.  He was the first indoor soccer player ever to reach 40,000 career minutes.

MISL II
On October 2, 2003, Nogueira signed a one-year contract with San Diego Sockers which was now competing in a new Major Indoor Soccer League (MISL). The Sockers began the 2004–2005 season, but folded after ten games. On January 5, 2005, the Baltimore Blast selected Nogueira in the third round of the MISL Dispersal Draft following the folding of the Sockers.  Nogueira chose to retire instead.

Futsal
Nogueira earned sixteen caps with the U.S. National Futsal team from 1992 to 2000.  The team gained its greatest success in 1992 when it took second place at FIFA Futsal World Championship. Nogueira was named both as the top goalkeeper of the tournament and to the first team all-tournament team. While the U.S. did not place in the 1996 tournament, Nogueira was selected as an honorable mention All Tournament. In 2000, the U.S. placed third at the CONCACAF Tournament, but only the top two teams qualified for the World Championship. Nogueira retired from the futsal team following the CONCACAF Tournament.

Coaching
Since his retirement from playing, Nogueira has coached professional teams, college teams and a youth soccer club. His daughter Casey currently plays in the National Women's Soccer League with FC Kansas City, and has also played for the United States women's national soccer team. Casey's husband Zach Loyd played in Major League Soccer for FC Dallas. Nogueira also coaches the Torrey Pines High School Freshman soccer team.
2010 – Victor moved to Orange County and coaches with West Coast Futbul Club.  In 2018, Nogueira became the goalkeeping coach for Orange County Soccer Club playing in USL Championship.

Honors
Championships
 NASL: 1984
 MISL: 1989, 1990, 1991, 1992
 NPSL: 1998, 2000, 2001

MVP
 MISL: 1991, 1992
 NPSL: 1996, 1998

Goalkeeper of the Year
 MISL: 1989, 1991
 NPSL: 1994, 1996, 1997, 1998, 1999, 2000, 2001
 MISL II: 2002, 2003

Championship MVP
 MISL: 1989
 NPSL: 1998

All Star Game MVP
 NPSL: 1998

First team All Star
 MISL: 1990, 1991
 NPSL: 1994, 1997, 1998, 1999,
 MISL II: 2002, 2003

FIFA FUTSAL Championship
 First Team All-World: 1992
 Honorable Mention All World: 1996
 Best Goalkeeper: 1992

References

External links
 San Diego Sockers profile
 San Diego United-Tribune article on Nogueira.
 NASL/MISL stats

Living people
Futsal goalkeepers
South African soccer players
South African expatriate soccer players
Newcastle United F.C. players
American people of South African descent
American soccer players
Association football goalkeepers
North American Soccer League (1968–1984) players
North American Soccer League (1968–1984) indoor players
Atlanta Chiefs players
Montreal Manic players
Chicago Sting (NASL) players
South African expatriate sportspeople in Canada
South African expatriate sportspeople in the United States
Major Indoor Soccer League (1978–1992) players
Chicago Sting (MISL) players
Cleveland Force (original MISL) players
San Diego Sockers (original MISL) players
National Professional Soccer League (1984–2001) players
Major Indoor Soccer League (2001–2008) players
Mozambican emigrants to South Africa
Portuguese expatriates in Mozambique
San Diego Sockers (2001–2004) players
American men's futsal players
1959 births
American people of Portuguese descent
American people of Mozambican descent
Rangers F.C. (South Africa) players
Expatriate soccer players in the United States
Expatriate soccer players in Canada
Milwaukee Wave players
Orange County SC coaches
Association football goalkeeping coaches